In Finnish mythology, the Nine diseases are the sons of Loviatar, the blind daughter of Tuoni. She is impregnated by wind (some versions of the story tell that Iku-Turso fathered them). According to the version told in the Kalevala they are Pistos (consumption), Ähky (colic), Luuvalo (gout), Riisi (rickets), Paise (ulcer), Rupi (scab), Syöjä (cancer), and Rutto (plague). The ninth, a witch and the worst of all, remains unnamed. He, the personification of envy, is banished by his mother to become the scourge of mankind. Other rune versions mention nine diseases by name the witch being the tenth son. Some of them also use more esoteric names such as Nuolennoutaja (Retriever of arrow), Painaja (Strainer or nightmare), Kielen kantaja (Carrier of tongue), Ohimoiden ottaja (Taker of temples), and Sydämen syöjä (Eater of heart), which can as well be interpreted as names of diseases. Louhi, the Mistress of North who acts as a midwife to the sons, sends them to Kaleva where they are defeated by Väinämöinen.

Excerpt from Kalevala

See also
Syöjätär, in one recorded Finnish folk song Syöjätär originates from the tenth child of Loviatar

Footnotes

References

Finnish mythology
Characters in the Kalevala